Valerie Allen Marland (16 June 1917 – 22 October 1977) was the wife of former Governor of West Virginia William C. Marland and served as that state's First Lady 1953-1957. She was born June 16, 1917 at Lacon, Illinois and married Marland in 1942. As first lady, she dedicated most of her time raising their four children. After former governor Marland lost an election to the United States Senate in 1958, the family moved to Barrington, Illinois, where Valerie Marland became a high school English teacher. The Marlands returned to West Virginia in 1965, but William Marland died of cancer shortly thereafter. Valerie Marland returned to Barrington, where she was killed in an apartment fire in 1977.

References

1917 births
1977 deaths
People from Lacon, Illinois
First Ladies and Gentlemen of West Virginia
20th-century American women